Hall du Paire is a multi-purpose arena in Pepinster, Belgium.  Hall du Paire holds 4,000 people and opened in 2006.  It hosts the home games of the RBC Verviers-Pepinster professional basketball club.

External links
Venue information

Basketball venues in Belgium
Indoor arenas in Belgium
Sports venues in Liège Province
Pepinster